The 1969 UCLA Bruins football team represented the University of California, Los Angeles (UCLA) as a member of the Pacific-8 Conference during the 1969 NCAA University Division football season. Led by fifth-year head coach Tommy Prothro, the Bruins compiled an overall record of 8–1–1 with a mark of 5–1–1 in conference play, tying for second place in the Pac-8. UCLA played home game at Los Angeles Memorial Coliseum in Los Angeles.

Regular season
This was the year Prothro had geared his recruiting efforts towards as he believed this was his best team and was capable of contending for the national championship. The Bruins, quarterbacked by a sensational Jr. College transfer Dennis Dummit discovered by Prothro, were undefeated until they faced #10 Stanford in Palo Alto. Once again, Prothro was let down by now senior kicker Zenon Andrusyshyn as he missed a short field goal late in the game with the score tied 20–20. Suddenly, two long Jim Plunkett passes had Stanford in field goal range in the final seconds, but UCLA blocked Steve Horowitz's attempt to preserve the tie.

Once again, the UCLA-USC game would decide the Pac-8 title and the 1970 Rose Bowl berth. UCLA was ranked 6th with a 5–0–1 record in conference and 8–0–1 overall  USC was #5 and was 6–0 in conference and 8–0–1 overall (tied Notre Dame in South Bend, 14–14); UCLA and USC were both unbeaten coming into their rivalry game for the first time since 1952. UCLA scored midway through the fourth quarter to take a 12–7 lead (knowing he need a win and not a tie to advance to the Rose Bowl, Prothro had the Bruins go for two after each touchdown and each attempt failed). USC then drove to the winning touchdown with 1:38 to play to win 14–12. The Trojans were aided by two controversial calls; the first was a dubious pass interference call on UCLA's Danny Graham on a 4th-and-10 incompletion. Secondly, on the winning touchdown pass reception, USC receiver Sam Dickerson appeared to be either out of bounds, out of the back of the end zone, or both.  This loss supposedly was harder for Prothro to take than the 1967 loss and the freak officiating calls resembled the debacle at Tennessee in 1965.

Schedule

Game summaries

USC

Roster

Offense
 83 Gwen Cooper LE
 79 Gordon Bosserman LT
 68 Ron Tretter LG
 50 Dave Dalby C
 67 Dennis Alumbaugh RG
 70 Lee McElroy RT
 87 Mike Garratt RE
 19 Dennis Dummit QB
 43 Greg Jones LH
 46 George Farmer RH
 Mickey Cureon FB

Defense
 93 Bob Geddes LE
 60 Bruce Jorgensen LT
 74 Floyd Reese RT
 89 Wesley Grant RE
 55 Don Widmer LLB
 44 K. Monty Harrison MLB
 57 Mike Ballou MLB
 92 Jim Ford RLB
28 Doug Huff LC
 20 Danny Graham RC
 23 Ron Carver LS
 27 Dennis Spurling RS

Coaches
 Tommy Prothro (Head)
 Earnel Durden
 Larry Weaver
Tony Kopay
 John Jardine
Jerry Long
 Lew Stueck
 Norman Dow
 Jim Camp
 Bobb McKittrick

References

UCLA
UCLA Bruins football seasons
UCLA Bruins football
UCLA Bruins football